Datuk Amar James Wong Kim Min (Pha̍k-fa-sṳ: Vòng Kîm-mìn) (6 August 1922 – 18 July 2011) was a Malaysian politician active in the politics of Sarawak for decades. Wong holds the record as the longest serving assemblyman in the history of the state of Sarawak, holding the office for nearly fifty years. Wong served as the first Deputy Chief Minister of Sarawak and the president of the Sarawak National Party (SNAP). He held several other ministries of Sarawak politics until his retirement in 2001.

Personal life
Wong was born in Limbang, Kingdom of Sarawak, on 6 August 1922. Sarawak was a British protectorate at the time.

Early political career
He began his political career in 1951, when he was elected to the Limbang District Council.

In 1956, Wong was elected to Sarawak's legislature, the Council Negri, which is now known as the Sarawak State Legislative Assembly. He continued to hold office in the Legislative Assembly until his retirement in 2001.

Malaysia became an independent country in 1963. Wong had been a member of the Malaysian Solidarity Convention's Sarawak delegation in 1962, which negotiated the formation of the new nation. Stephen Kalong Ningkan, the then president of the Sarawak National Party (SNAP), became the first Chief Minister of Sarawak, while Wong became the state's first deputy Chief Minister.

Member of the opposition
SNAP pulled out of the national coalition government, led by the Alliance Party, and became an opposition party. Wong, a member of the SNAP, won a seat in the Parliament of Malaysia in the 1969 general election, representing the Miri-Subis constituency. Wong became the leader of the Malaysian Opposition in August 1974. Wong would later be arrested under the Internal Security Act on 30 October 1974 and held at the Kamunting Detention Centre for several years. In 1981, Wong became the third president of the Sarawak National Party.

Reconciliation with Barisan Nasional
Wong's Sarawak National Party reconciled and rejoined the successor of the Alliance, the Barisan Nasional. Under the new coalition, Wong became a minister in Sarawak's state cabinet, holding several portfolios during the 1980s, 1990s and early 2000s. Wong became the Environment and Tourism Minister of Sarawak from 1987 to 1994. He then became the state Minister of Environment and Housing from 1995 to 1997 and finally the state Minister of Environment and Public Health from 1998 until his retirement in 2001. In 2001, Wong, who was still serving as Environment Minister, was awarded the Langkawi Award for to work in launching a sea turtle satellite tracking program and spearheading a new reefball project for coral reefs.

Retirement from politics
Wong retired from politics in 2001. He continued to author new books and poems during his retirement. Wong authored The Price of Loyalty, a book about his imprisonment at the Kamunting detention center under the Internal Security Act. By 2003, Wong had published the third addition of The Birth of Malaysia, a history of the country. He also released a third book, Memories of Speeches at the Council Negri. In addition to his books, Wong also wrote poetry during his later life. His poetry collections included A Special Breed in 1981, Shimmering Moonbeams in 1983, Buy a Little Time in 1989 and Beautiful Butterfly in 2009.

Wong also spearheaded the push to have Malaysia Day declared a national holiday. In 2010, Malaysia Day was finally declared an official holiday, to be celebrated nationwide on 16 September of every year. Wong spoke of Malaysia Day in 2010 saying, "It is my hope that Malaysia Day will be celebrated every 16 September. People should remember it because it's a historic occasion."

Death
James Wong suffered a heart attack on 18 July 2011. He died shortly after 10 a.m. at the Normah Medical Specialist Centre in Kuching, Sarawak, Malaysia, at the age of 90. Wong was survived by his wife, Datin Amar Valerie Bong; five daughters; three sons; thirteen grandchildren and four great-grandchildren.

He was buried in Limbang at the family cemetery in Jalan Pandaruan. Dignitaries in attendance included members of each of Sarawak's major ethnic groups, including the Chinese, the Kedayan, Brunei Malays, Bisaya, Tabun, Lun Bawang and Iban.

Sarawak's government announced that it will put together an exhibit of Wong's documents at the state museum.

References

1922 births
2011 deaths
Deputy Chief Ministers of Sarawak
Members of the Dewan Rakyat
Members of the Sarawak State Legislative Assembly
Sarawak state ministers
Malaysian Leaders of the Opposition
Sarawak National Party politicians
Malaysian poets
Malaysian writers
People from Sarawak
Malaysian people of Hakka descent
Malaysian politicians of Chinese descent
20th-century poets